Jacques Wahl (born 26 February 1971) is a South African cricketer. He played in three first-class matches for Boland in 1993/94.

See also
 List of Boland representative cricketers

References

External links
 

1971 births
Living people
South African cricketers
Boland cricketers
Cricketers from Cape Town